The Colorado Music Hall of Fame is a museum located in the Trading Post at Red Rocks Amphitheatre.

The Colorado Music Hall of Fame inducted its first honorees in 2011, with songwriter John Denver and the Red Rocks Amphitheatre as its first honorees. Memorabilia includes the John Denver "Spirit" statue, donated by the Windstar Foundation.

Executive director G. Brown, a music writer, critic and radio personality, was succeeded in early 2018 by musician Chris Daniels.

Honorees

2011
John Denver
Red Rocks Amphitheatre

2012
Barry Fey
Flash Cadillac
KIMN Radio
Sugarloaf
The Astronauts
Harry Tuft

2013
Judy Collins
Chris Daniels
Bob Lind
Serendipity Singers

2015
Firefall 
Manassas (featuring Stephen Stills)
Nitty Gritty Dirt Band
Poco

2016
Lannie Garrett
Glenn Miller
Max Morath (ragtime music performer)
Billy Murray
Elizabeth Spencer
Paul Whiteman

2017
Dan Fogelberg
Joe Walsh/Barnstorm
Caribou Ranch recording studio
Philip Bailey
Charles Burrelll
Larry Dunn
Bill Frisell
Ron Miles
Dianne Reeves

2018
KBCO
Chuck Morris

2019
Walt Conley
Dick Weissman
Swallow Hill Music
The Mother Folkers
Tommy Bolin
Otis Taylor
Zephyr
Freddi & Henchi
Wendy Lynn Kale

See also
 List of music museums

References

External links 
 

Halls of fame in Colorado
Museums in Jefferson County, Colorado
Music halls of fame
Music of Colorado
Music museums in the United States
Performing arts in Colorado
Pueblo Revival architecture in Colorado